"Scary Monsters and Nice Sprites"  is a song by American electronic dance music producer Skrillex. It was released as the lead single from his second EP of the same name. It uses a vocal sample of exclamations from Rachael Nedrow (also known as "speedstackinggirl") shouting "Yes, oh my gosh!", after speedily stacking a set of cups in one of her YouTube videos. Although permission to use the sample was not initially granted nor was Nedrow aware of its use, she was later compensated an undisclosed sum. On October 3, 2013, the song was certified 2× Platinum by the Recording Industry Association of America (RIAA), with sales exceeding 2,000,000 units. It was also certified Gold within Canada, with sales exceeding 40,000 units. On February 12, the song won Best Dance Recording at the 54th Grammy Awards.

It was used in the 2012 film Spring Breakers and an ad for GoPro titled "Kayak Kiss with Ben Brown", and also the video games MLB 2K12 and Ridge Racer Unbounded.

The song name was inspired by the David Bowie album and song Scary Monsters (and Super Creeps), and has been remixed by a variety of producers such as Zedd, Noisia, Kaskade among others.

As a mosquito repellent 
According to a scientific study published in Acta Tropica, the song can provide protection against mosquito bites; in the study, the authors write that "female mosquitoes exposed to the song 'Scary Monsters And Nice Sprites' attacked hosts much later than their non-exposed peers." Although this observation at first glance is humorous, it also indicates that low-frequency tones (a signature of "Scary Monsters And Nice Sprites") can serve as a more environmentally friendly means of pest control (versus pesticides).

Track listing

Official remixes
 Dirtyphonics Remix
 The Juggernaut Remix
 Kaskade Remix
 Noisia Remix
 Phonat Remix
 Zedd Remix

Charts and certifications

Weekly charts

Year-end charts

Certifications

References

Songs about monsters
2010 singles
Skrillex songs
Grammy Award for Best Dance Recording
Song recordings produced by Skrillex
Songs written by Skrillex
Songs written for films
2010 songs
Big Beat Records (American record label) singles